Mangesh Hattikudur is an American businessman who is the co-founder of the American humor magazine Mental Floss, which he started with Will Pearson when both were students at Duke University. Hattikudur graduated from Duke in 2001, with a Bachelor of Arts degree. The Huffington Post in 2010 wrote that Hattikudur and Pearson have created a knowledge empire complete with board games, T-shirts, and a website called mentalfloss.com which has monthly visitors tallying into the millions. They have collaborated on books such as The Mental Floss History of the United States along with writer Erik Sass.

Beginning in June 2017, Will and Mangesh have been producing the podcast Part Time Genius, a variety style knowledge show, created in partner with HowStuffWorks.

References

External links
 Mental floss website

Year of birth missing (living people)
Duke University alumni
American magazine editors
Living people